Carcarañá is a city in the , located in the San Lorenzo Department, on the southern banks of the Carcarañá River,  west of Rosario on National Route 9, and  south of the provincial capital. As of the  it has about 22,000 inhabitants.

Carcarañá was founded in 1870 and attained the status of comuna (commune) on 10 December 1890.
It is the birthplace of José Ernesto Sosa, Claudio Yacob, and brothers  Javier and Germán Lux.

References
In Spanish unless otherwise noted.
 Municipality of Carcarañá - Official website.
 Caracara, portal of the city.
 
 

Populated places in Santa Fe Province